Senator Parker may refer to:

Members of the United States Senate
Nahum Parker (1760–1839), U.S. Senator from New Hampshire
Richard E. Parker (1783–1840), U.S. Senator from Virginia

United States state senate members
Abraham X. Parker (1831–1909), New York State Senate
Alban J. Parker (1893–1971), Vermont State Senate
Amasa J. Parker Jr. (1843–1938), New York State Senate
Barry T. Parker (born 1932), New Jersey State Senate
David Parker (Mississippi politician) (born 1969), Mississippi State Senate
Edward Griffin Parker (1825–1868), Massachusetts State Senate
Fordis C. Parker (1868–1945), Massachusetts State Senate
James Parker (Massachusetts politician) (1768–1837), Massachusetts State Senate
John Francis Parker (1907–1992), Massachusetts State Senate
Kathleen Parker (politician) (born 1943), Illinois State Senate
Kathy Parker (born 1943), Illinois State Senate
Kevin Parker (New York politician) (born 1967), New York State Senate
Lester T. Parker (1900–1974), Washington State Senate
Marshall Parker (1922–2008), South Carolina State Senate
Scudder Parker (born 1943), Vermont State Senate
Severn E. Parker (1787–1836), Virginia State Senate